Next Time (sometimes rendered "Некст Тајм"  in Macedonian Cyrillic) is a popular rock duo from Skopje, North Macedonia. The duo consists of twin brothers Martin and Stefan Filipovski. Stefan fronts the band as the lead singer, while Martin plays the guitar and sings back-up vocals. The group represented the Republic of Macedonia at the Eurovision Song Contest 2009 in Moscow, Russia but failed to reach the final.

History
Next Time was formed in early 2008 after they signed with Plan B Production. Previously they performed as a garage band at children's music festivals. Discovered by composer and songwriter, Jovan Jovanov, the Macedonian duo released their first single "Ne veruvam vo tebe" ("I Don't Believe in You") in May, 2008. The song's lyrics were written by Next Time with Jovanov as the producer. "Ne veruvam vo tebe" immediately topped a number of charts in Macedonia and was quickly a hit. The band also released their first music video for the song. Next Time's first festival appearance was at the First Radio Music Festival "Zvezdena Nok" in June, 2008. At "Zvezdena Nok", the duo won the "Summer Hit of the Year" award with their second song "Me misliš li?" ("Am I In Your Thoughts?"). Two months later at Ohrid Fest, Next Time were voted "Best New Artist" with their third single "Me ostavi sam da živeam" ("You Left Me All Alone"). Next Time's biggest festival success came in October when they won the second semi-final at MakFest. With their fourth single "Bez tebe tivko umiram" ("I'm Slowly Dying Without You") they went on to finish second in the final, only three points behind the winner.

On the 16th of December, 2008, Next Time released their self-titled debut album. The Next Time Album featured 13 songs, two of which were bonus songs sung in a foreign language. One of the bonus songs was in English and was named "Why Did You Go". The other was a cover of the Italian pop-opera song "Caruso". The first four singles were all accompanied by music videos. 

In February 2009, Next Time competed at Skopje Fest, a Macedonian music competition and the national selection for the country's Eurovision Song Contest entry, performing the song Nešto što kje ostane (Something That Will Remain). The group won the competition, and represented Macedonia at the 2009 Eurovision Song Contest in Moscow. Competing in the first semi-final, Next Time did not advance to the finals, finishing in 10th place after the viewers' and the jury's vote.

Discography

Albums
 Next Time (2008)
 Na krajot od denot (At the end of the day) (2011)

Solo singles
 "Ne veruvam vo tebe" (2008)
 "Me misliš li?" (2008)
 "Me ostavi sam da živeam" (2008)
 "Bez tebe tivko umiram" (2008)
 "Caruso" (2008)
 "Nešto što kje ostane" (2009)
 "The Sweetest Thing That Will Remain" (2009)
 "Milion" (2009)
 "Nemam ni glas" (2009)
 "Koga lažeš, kade gledaš?" (2009)
 "Dekemvri" (2009)
 "Ramo za plačenje" (2010)
 "Ubava" (2010)
 "Na krajot od denot" (2010)
 "Nedostaješ mi več" (2011)
 "Rap n Roll" (2011)
 "Posledno od nas" (2012)
 "Čekam na tebe" (2012)
 "Lice od raj" (2012)
 "Next Time" (2013)
 "Svetot vo race" (2013)
 "Ja izlezi Gjurgjo" (2014)
 "Slušam kaj šumat šumite" (2017)
 "Nesto ke te pitam babo" (2019)
 "Jovka Kumanovka" (2019)
 "Koga padna na Pirina" (2022)

Awards

Radiski Festival - Zvezdena Nok (June, 2008)
 Summer Hit of the Year

TV Orbis (August, 2008)
 Star Orbit of popularity

Ohrid Fest (August, 2008)
 Best New Artist

Makfest (October, 2008)
 First place (semi-final night)
 Second place (final night)

MARS Festival
 Hit of the Year 2008 - "Me ostavi sam da živeam"
 Hit of the Year 2009 - "Nešto što kje ostane"
 Hit of the Year 2010 - "Ubava"
 Hit of the Year 2011 - "Na krajot od denot"
 Hit of the Year 2012 - "Lice od raj"

Skopje Fest (February, 2009)
 First Place - Qualified for Eurovision 2009

Zlatna Buba mara na popularnosta (2009)
 Best New Artist

Zlatna Buba mara na popularnosta (2022)
 Best video (Koga Padna na Pirina)

Marco Polo Festival (Korčula, Croatia 2011, 2012)
First Place with the song Nedostaješ mi več (Miss You Already 2011)
Second Place with the song Poslednje od nas (The Last of Us 2012)

Other awards
 SuperStar - Teenage Idols of 2008
 Macedonian Ministry of Culture - Diploma for Recognition

Concerts 
 Univerzalna Sala Skopje (2009)
 Heraklea Bitola (2010)

References
 https://www.gettyimages.com/detail/news-photo/martin-filipovski-and-stefan-filipovski-of-the-band-next-news-photo/87137066

External links
 https://www.facebook.com/nexttimeband
 https://www.instagram.com/nexttimeband/
 https://www.youtube.com/user/NexttimeBand
 https://itunes.apple.com/us/artist/next-time/1463710615
 https://open.spotify.com/artist/5SlsJR9zb4aUeT6F87tZ2t
 https://www.amazon.com/gp/product/B08P83TNB3/ref=dm_ws_sp_ps_dp

Rock music duos
Sibling musical duos
Macedonian rock music groups
Eurovision Song Contest entrants of 2009
Eurovision Song Contest entrants for North Macedonia
Musical groups established in 2008